The Larches (Welsh: Bryngaer Coed y Mynydd) near Trellech is a Celtic Iron Age hillfort. OS reference: SO492037.

This fort was registered by Cadw and is identified with the number SAM: MM069. There are approximately 300 hillforts in Cadw's list of monuments, although archaeologists believe there were nearly 600 in total.

See also
List of hill forts in Wales

References

Hillforts in Monmouthshire
Scheduled monuments in Monmouthshire